Justice Adkins may refer to:

James C. Adkins, justice of the Supreme Court of Florida
Sally D. Adkins, judge of the Maryland Court of Appeals
William H. Adkins, judge of the Maryland Court of Appeals
William H. Adkins II, judge of the Maryland Court of Appeals